Vladimir Ivanovich Kashin (born 10 August 1948) is a Russian politician who served as a deputy for the Communist Party of the Russian Federation in the 7th State Duma of the Russian Federation. He served as head of the committee on Agrarian Issues. Doctor of Sciences (1970), Academician of the Russian Academy of Agricultural Sciences (since 1997), Academician of the Russian Academy of Sciences (since 2013). Laureate of the Prize of the Council of Ministers of the Soviet Union and of the Prize of the Government of the Russian Federation. Honored Scientist of the Russian Federation (2009).

He graduated from the P.A. Kostychev Ryazan State Agrotechnological University in 1971. In 1976, he defended his Candidate's Dissertation. In 1994, he defended his doctoral dissertation.

Kashin is the author more than 150 scientific papers.

Kashin was sanctioned by the United States Department of the Treasury following the 2022 Russian invasion of Ukraine.

References 

21st-century Russian politicians
Living people
Russian communists
Communist Party of the Russian Federation members
Academicians of the Russian Academy of Agriculture Sciences
Full Members of the Russian Academy of Sciences
Russian professors
Honoured Scientists of the Russian Federation
Fourth convocation members of the State Duma (Russian Federation)
Fifth convocation members of the State Duma (Russian Federation)
Sixth convocation members of the State Duma (Russian Federation)
Seventh convocation members of the State Duma (Russian Federation)
Eighth convocation members of the State Duma (Russian Federation)
1948 births